A4V may refer to:

 A4V mutation, which causes amyotrophic lateral sclerosis (ALS)
 Acceptance for value or Accepted for value, a scam based on a phony payment method promoted in the redemption movement